The Jersey Off Road Bicycle Association (JORBA) is a mountain biking association based in Princeton Junction, New Jersey, United States, founded in 1999.  Their activities include trail maintenance, sustainable trail building, group rides and skills clinics.  JORBA is a 501(c)(3) non-profit organization.  JORBA is an affiliated club of the International Mountain Biking Association.

External links
 

Mountain biking teams and clubs in the United States
Non-profit organizations based in New Jersey
Cycling organizations in the United States
Organizations established in 1999
1999 establishments in New Jersey
West Windsor, New Jersey